Le Colonial is an old colonial house located in Cochin, Kerala, India. It is now used as a hotel.

History
Le Colonial was built by the Portuguese in 1506. It is said to have housed Francis Xavier and Vasco da Gama. It remained in the hands of the Portuguese for 150 years and when Cochin was conquered by the Dutch it was one of the rare houses not to be destroyed during the assault. Le Colonial housed the Dutch governors until 1795 when it was sold to the British. It then belonged to J. Thomas, a British tea trader.

The building was constructed in 1506 at the same time as St Francis Church. It was the Portuguese governor's private residence as opposed to his main office. St Francis Xavier is said to have lived in the house which has, among other names, also been called the St Francis Bungalow. Above the main gate one can see the date of construction and the Dutch addition of "VOC" (Venerable Dutch East India Company).

The last Dutch governor Jan van Spall sold it in 1795 to the British. That is why it was also called Jan van Spall Huiss. The original sales deed can be seen framed in the house. During the Dutch occupation, French Admiral Mahé de La Bourdonnais, on his way from Pondichéry to Mahé in North Kerala, spent a night in the house. In 1795, Major Petrie and his British East India Company army took over Fort Cochin, and after the capitulation van Spall supposedly received Major Petrie as his guest in the house.

The house was sold in the mid 20th century to the tea trader J Thomas and came to be known as the J Thomas Bungalow. In 2004, it was saved as a historic monument. The house now contains many works of art and antique furniture. Each room is named and styled after figures connected with its past: Jan van Spall, Major Petrie, J Thomas, Vasco da Gama, Mahé de La Bourdonnais, Tipoo Sultan, the British viceroy and his ADC. Maureen van Spall is alive and well in the Netherlands.

References

Heritage hotels in India
Hotels in Kochi